Pecks Mill is an unincorporated community in Logan County, West Virginia, United States. Pecks Mill has a post office with ZIP code 25547.

The community was named after the Peck family, the proprietors of a local gristmill.

References

Unincorporated communities in Logan County, West Virginia
Unincorporated communities in West Virginia
Populated places on the Guyandotte River